This article refers to crime in the U.S. state of Louisiana.

Statistics
According to the Louisiana Uniform Crime reporting program, there were 177,710 crimes reported in Louisiana in 2018. 2018 had the least amount of non-violent criminal offenses since at least 2008. Violent crime decreased from 2017 to 2018, but 2012 still remains the lowest with its record of 22,868. Rape went up 12.7% from 2017 while murder/non-negligent manslaughter declined 7.8%. Additionally, robbery dropped 15% and aggravated assault dropped 1.5%. Handguns remain the leading murder weapon with a rate of 44.7% with firearm (type unknown) following close behind at 35.7%. Together, these two contribute for 80.4% of the murders. Similarly, robberies were committed mostly with firearms in 2018. Firearms were leading with 52% and strongarm listed with a percentage of 35%.

Homicide statistics
Louisiana experienced the highest per-capita murder rate (15.8 per 100,000) among all U.S. states in 2020 for the 32nd straight year (1989–2020), according to The 2020 FBI Uniform Crime Report. Louisiana averaged 13.7 murders per 100,000, compared to the U.S. average of 6.6 murders per 100,000 from 1989- 2014.

Crime statistics: 1995–2019
Crime totals by offense in the state of Louisiana from 1995 through 2018 as recorded by the FBI's Uniform Crime Reports.

Numbers vary by year. Some reports list statistics for the previous year higher/lower than shown on said previous year's report.

By location

New Orleans

In 2019, New Orleans had 121 murders with a rate of 30.7, ranking it number four in the top homicide city rates in the U.S. Despite this high number nationwide, this is still one of the lowest homicide rates for New Orleans since 1971. In 2018, New Orleans had 143 murders. Other violent crimes in 2018 also experienced a drop from previous years. New Orleans had the highest murder rate of any major American city in 2008 (42.1 per 100,000 people) 2001 (44.0 per 100,000) 2002 (53.1 per 100,000) 2003 (57.7 per 100,000) 2004 (56.0 per 100,000) 2006 (70 per 100,000) 2007 (81 per 100,000) 2008 (63.6 per 100,000) 2009 (52 per 100,000) 2010 (51 per 100,000) and 2011 {57.6 per 100,000} as well.

Baton Rouge
In 2019, Baton Rouge had 83 murders with homicide rate was a per-capita homicide rate 31. This is a downwards trend from the 106 murders in 2017, the recent record high.

2011 
In In 2011, there were 15,134 crimes committed in Baton Rouge, including 64 murders, 51 forcible rapes, and 12,666 property crimes. The murder rate in Baton Rouge for 2011 was the 8th highest in the nation among large cities at 27.6 per 100,000. Baton Rouge also had the 25th highest violent crime rate in the U.S. in 2011 with a rate of 1,065.7 violent crimes per 100,000, surpassing New Orleans at 792 per 100,000. The Baton Rouge Police Department currently employs 789 police personnel (police officers, dispatchers and specialty positions).

Capital punishment laws

Capital punishment is applied in Louisiana. Executions are carried out by lethal injection at the Louisiana State Penitentiary (also known as Angola) and the Louisiana Correctional Institute for Women at St. Gabriel.

The first recorded execution in Louisiana occurred on September 24, 1722, when an unnamed man was hanged for theft. The most recent execution took place on January 7, 2010 when Gerald J. Bordelon was put to death for the murder of his stepdaughter, Courtney Leblanc. It was the first execution in Louisiana since 2002.

On June 29, 1972, the U.S. Supreme Court issued a ruling in Furman v. Georgia, which halted capital punishment in the United States. Prior to this moratorium, however, Louisiana had not carried out an execution since Jesse James Ferguson was put to death in 1961. Capital punishment was reinstated in Louisiana in 1976 following the U.S. Supreme Court decision in Gregg v. Georgia. The first execution to occur in the state following the lifting of the moratorium was on December 14, 1983, when Robert Wayne Williams was electrocuted. In total, Louisiana has executed 660 people. Eight convicted death row inmates have been exonerated in Louisiana since 1976.

Notable criminals

Nathaniel Code – 1980s serial killer of eight people.
Ronald Dominique – A Louisiana serial killer with at least 23 victims.
Sean Vincent Gillis – Serial killer of eight women.
Derrick Todd Lee – Nicknamed the "Baton Rouge Serial Killer", he has been linked to seven murders.
John Allen Muhammad – Born in Baton Rouge, the "Beltway Sniper" killed ten people around the Washington D.C. area during the Beltway sniper attacks. Muhammad and his accomplice, Lee Boyd Malvo, are also linked to shootings outside of Washington D.C. including two in Louisiana.
Elmo Patrick Sonnier – Convicted murderer and rapist who became the inspiration for Sister Helen Prejean's best-selling book Dead Man Walking.
Robert Lee Willie – Convicted murderer and rapist who also became the inspiration for Sister Helen Prejean's book Dead Man Walking. Sean Penn's physical appearance in the film was based on that of Willie.
Angola 3 – The Angola 3 refers to 3 inmates, Robert Hillary King, Albert Woodfox and Herman Wallace, who were placed into solitary confinement at Angola after the death of a prison guard, Brent Miller. Their case led to several high-profile documentaries and legal interest concerning solitary confinement.
Corey Miller – Better known as C-Murder, the rapper and actor is currently serving a life sentence for the murder of Steve Thomas at a nightclub in Harvey, Louisiana.
Clifford Etienne – Also known as the "Black Rhino", Etienne is a former professional boxer who fought many notable boxers including Lawrence Clay Bey, Lamon Brewster, Mike Tyson, Calvin Brock, and Nicolay Valuev. He is currently serving a 105-year prison sentence for armed robbery, kidnapping, and the attempted murder of a police officer.  
Jean Lafitte – Early 19th century French pirate who operated in and around New Orleans and Barataria Bay, Louisiana. Lafitte and his fellow privateers fought in the Battle of New Orleans after receiving a full pardon from Andrew Jackson.
Samuel Israel III – Born in New Orleans, Israel was founder and hedge fund manager of Bayou Hedge Fund Group. He was convicted of defrauding investors out of $450 million in one of Wall Street's biggest recent frauds. His crimes and subsequent manhunt have been featured on Dateline, America's Most Wanted, and American Greed.
Edwin Edwards – Former Governor of Louisiana (1972–1980, 1984–1988 and 1992–1996) convicted of seventeen counts of racketeering, extortion, money laundering, mail fraud and wire fraud.
Clementine Barnabet – Clementine is considered the first African American female serial killer, having reportedly confessed to orchestrating and participating in 35 murders in southwest Louisiana and southeast Texas.
Axeman – Serial killer in New Orleans around 1918.
Antoinette Frank – Antoinette Frank was a New Orleans police officer when she and her then boyfriend Rogers LaCaze killed Officer Ronald Williams and siblings Ha and Cuong Vu, owners of the Kim Anh restaurant, during a 1995 robbery. She is currently the only woman on Louisiana's death row. 
Zachary Bowen – Former war hero and veteran met his girlfriend, Addie Hall, After Hurricane Katrina in 2006. Addie was supposedly preparing to leave Bowen. Then on October 17, 2006, Bowen jumped from the roof of a parking garage. A suicide note found in his pocket led police to his apartment where pieces of Addie Halls body was found in pots and pans on the stove.

Year by Year

2012 
All categories of crime decreased in 2012 from 2011, except for robbery, which saw a 4.6% increase. Louisiana's overall crime rate, at 4,037.5, ranked fourth among U.S. states in 2012. Among the ten largest cities in Louisiana, the town of Alexandria had the highest crime rate at 9,174.6 crimes per 100,000 people.

Property crimes represented 88% of all reported criminal acts in 2012. There were 162,936 property crimes committed in Louisiana that year. Property crimes include burglary, larceny/theft and motor vehicle theft. The rate for property crimes in 2012 stood at 3,540.6 which was a 3.9% decrease from 2011. Police reported 15,740 aggravated assaults for a rate of 342.0. This marked a 14.8% drop in the aggravated assault rate from 2011; the largest decrease of all crimes. Louisiana ranked eighth in the aggravated assault rate among U.S. states in 2012. In addition, 1,158 incidents of forcible rape were recorded by police in 2012 for a rate of 25.2. The forcible rape rate decreased 8.8% from 2011. Louisiana ranked 37th in the rate of forcible rape among U.S. states in 2012. Despite a 2.8% decrease in its murder rate for 2012, Louisiana had the highest murder rate among U.S. states at 10.8 homicides per 100,000 people. The total number of homicides perpetrated in Louisiana in 2012 were 495, a decrease of 11 murders from 2011. Firearms accounted for 370 murders or 81% of all homicides. With 193 homicides, New Orleans had the highest total number of murders for any city in Louisiana. Two police officers were murdered in the line of duty in 2012.

Louisiana had the highest incarceration rate (847.1 per 100,000) among U.S. states in 2013 for the 16th consecutive year. In 2012, Louisiana's prison population stood at 41,248, a 3.9% increase from 2011, for an incarceration rate of 893 prisoners per 100,000 people.

2018 
According to the Louisiana Uniform Crime reporting program, there were 177,710 crimes reported in Louisiana in 2018. 2018 had the least amount of non-violent criminal offenses since at least 2008. Violent crime decreased from 2017 to 2018, but 2012 still remains the lowest with its record of 22,868. Rape went up 12.7% from 2017 while murder/non-negligent manslaughter declined 7.8%. Additionally, robbery dropped 15% and aggravated assault dropped 1.5%. Handguns remain the leading murder weapon with a rate of 44.7% with firearm (type unknown) following close behind at 35.7%. Together, these two contribute for 80.4% of the murders. Similarly, robberies were committed mostly with firearms in 2018. Firearms were leading with 52% and strongarm listed with a percentage of 35%.

References